Richard Bradley Schlesinger, Jr. (born September 2, 1946) is an American former handball player who competed in the 1972 Summer Olympics.

He was born in Chicago.

In 1972 he was part of the American team which finished 14th in the Olympic tournament. He played all five matches and scored four goals.

External links
 profile

1946 births
Living people
American male handball players
Olympic handball players of the United States
Handball players at the 1972 Summer Olympics
Sportspeople from Chicago